Tunworth is a hamlet and civil parish in Hampshire.

Geography

Location
Tunworth is located in North East Hampshire. There are numerous villages nearby, such as
Upton Grey, 1.5 miles (2.4 km) to the east
Weston Patrick, 1.6 miles (2.6 km) to the south east
Mapledurwell, 2.8 miles (4.5 km) to the north
Winslade, 1.9 miles (3.0 km) to the west
Herriard, 3.0 miles (4.8 km) to the south

All distances were determined using Google Maps, and are therefore by road rather than direct.

Physical geography
The village is spread across several hills, known as the Tunworth Downs. These are caused by the same geological processes as the North Downs. The highest point in Tunworth is around 420 ft (130m)

Buildings
The little downland church of All Saints, Tunworth, is part of the benefice of Upton Grey. The church is 12th century. The church has Norman origins, though the only real sign of this, after the Victorian restoration, is a window on the north (far) side of the church. A notable grave in the churchyard is that of Colonel Julian Berry, son of the 1st Viscount Camrose of Hackwood Park.

Amenities
Tunworth has one amenity, a bench, placed at the village high point. In 2012, an oak was planted by the bench to mark the Diamond Jubilee of Elizabeth II. There was a school in Tunworth, but this was closed down in the 1950s. Most children now attend either a Basingstoke School or Long Sutton School.

Economy
The economy of Tunworth is mainly based in the service industry. The land around Tunworth is cultivated, meaning that there is some agriculture. In the past, successful race horses have been bred in Tunworth. A large proportion of Tunworth residents do not work, as Tunworth has a significant number of older people.

Land ownership

Most of the land around Tunworth is either owned by the Herriard Estate, or by Hackwood Park. This land is rented to various farmers and is also used for pheasant shooting. Some property is owned by the Herriard Estate as well, and is rented out.

References

External links

 Hampshire Treasures: Volume 2 (Basingstoke and Deane) Tunworth Pages 317 and 319
 Stained Glass Windows at All Saints, Tunworth, Hampshire
 Tunworth
 Information on the Church and additional history
 Tunworth (Hampshire County Council)
 Listed Buildings in Tunworth, Hampshire, England
 Tunworth Church of England School, Basingstoke (National Archives)
 Tunworth parish (National Archives)
 Tunworth (Old Hampshire Gazetteer)
 Conservation Area Appraisal: Tunworth
 The path from Tunworth Church

Villages in Hampshire
Civil parishes in Basingstoke and Deane